Elsa Anna Sofie Hosk (born in Stockholm on 7 November 1988) is a Swedish-based model and former Victoria's Secret Angel, who has worked for brands including Dior, Dolce & Gabbana, Ungaro, H&M, Anna Sui, Lilly Pulitzer and Guess. She modeled for Victoria's Secret, appearing in the brand's annual fashion show from 2011 to 2018. She has also appeared in many of the brand's campaigns, especially for the sub-division PINK. In 2015, she was announced as one of 10 new Victoria's Secret Angels.
She has also played professional basketball in Sweden.

Career 
Hosk was born in Stockholm on 7 November 1988 in Stockholm. Growing up in Sweden, Hosk was presented with offers to model during high school after her father submitted photographs to various modeling agencies in Sweden when she was 13; she began modeling at 14. She did some modeling in high school but decided to primarily concentrate on her studies instead (she did some notable work with Guess and other companies however). After graduating, she decided to pursue a career in the Swedish women's basketball league. Hosk has commented that the level of play in the Swedish professional basketball league was not on par with the WNBA, and that interest in the sport was not as great in Sweden as in the United States. Although she ultimately abandoned professional basketball for modeling, Hosk has said that the intense rigor of practices (8 per week when playing basketball) and travel helped prepare her for the physical and travel demands of the modeling world.

After playing professional basketball for two years, she began receiving many job offers and soon moved to New York City to begin modeling full-time. Some writers have speculated that her work with Victoria's Secret was what brought her into the top tier fashion world, but Hosk also identifies her work with photographer Ellen von Unwerth in campaigns for Guess.

She is ranked 15th on the Top Sexiest Models list by models.com. She opened the Victoria's Secret Fashion Show in 2016 and wore the Swarovski outfit in 2017. She was chosen to wear the "Dream Angels" Fantasy Bra in the 2018 Victoria's Secret Fashion Show held in New York City on 8 November 2018. The bra, worth US$1 million, was designed by Atelier Swarovski and hand-set with 2,100 Swarovski created diamonds.
She has walked for designers like Versace, Dior, Jean Paul Gaultier, YSL, Balmain, Moschino, Calvin Klein, Isabel Marant, Brandon Maxwell, LaQuan Smith, Valentino, Michael Kors, Miu Miu, Alberta Ferretti, Blumarine, Max Mara, Dolce&Gabbana, Escada, Etro, Carolina Herrera, Jeremy Scott and many more.

Personal life 
Hosk is the daughter of Swedish father Pål and Finnish mother Marja. She has two brothers. Her cousin, Alice Herbst, is also a model. Herbst won the televised competition of Sweden's Next Top Model in 2012.

Hosk has worked to support the anti-human-trafficking organization, FAIR Girls. She became interested in the issue after seeing the movie The Whistleblower, which dealt with issues of sex trafficking.

Though the media often notes her striking physical resemblance and nominal correlation to Queen Elsa from Disney's 2013 film Frozen, she denies any connection to the character or media franchise.

Since the beginning of 2015, she has a relationship with a British businessman Tom Daly. Their daughter Tuulikki Joan Daly was born in February 2021.

Filmography

References

External links 

 
 

1988 births
Living people
Swedish female models
People from Stockholm
Swedish women's basketball players
Sportspeople from Stockholm
IMG Models models
Swedish people of Finnish descent
People educated at Enskilda Gymnasiet
Victoria's Secret Angels
Swedish expatriates in the United States